Queens, the largest of New York City's five boroughs by area, is home to at least 36 skyscrapers taller than . At , Skyline Tower, a residential skyscraper in Long Island City, is the tallest building in Queens, and the second tallest building in New York outside of Manhattan. It surpassed the nearby  One Court Square, which was Queens' tallest building from 1990 to 2021, and remains the tallest office building in the borough.

The skyscraper came to Queens in 1927 with the construction of the Bank of the Manhattan Company Building. It remained the tallest building in the borough until the completion of the Kennedy House in 1964, and the tallest office building in the borough until 1990. Queens has recently undergone a high-rise construction boom, with the majority of the borough's tallest completed since 2010. Long Island City in particular has added residential units at a faster rate than any other neighborhood in the United States.

Tallest buildings

An equal sign (=) following a rank indicates the same height between two or more buildings. An asterisk (*) indicates that the building is still under construction, but has been topped out. The "Year" column indicates the year in which a building was completed.

Tallest under construction or proposed

Under construction
This lists buildings that are currently under construction in Queens and are expected to rise to a height of at least . For buildings whose heights have not yet been released by their developers, this table uses a floor count of 30 stories as the cutoff.

* Table entries with dashes (—) indicate that information regarding expected building heights or dates of completion has not yet been released.

Proposed
This table lists buildings that are proposed for construction in Queens and are expected to rise at least  in height. For buildings whose heights have not yet been released by their developers, this table uses a floor count of 30 stories as the cutoff.

* Table entries with dashes (—) indicate that information regarding building heights or dates of completion has not yet been released.

Timeline of tallest buildings
This lists buildings that once held the title of tallest building in Queens.

See also

 Architecture of New York City
 List of tallest buildings in Brooklyn
 List of tallest buildings on Long Island
 List of tallest buildings in New York City

References

External links
 Diagram of New York City skyscrapers on SkyscraperPage

Queens
Queens
Tallest buildings in Queens

Tallest in Queens